

Season summary
Although technically performing worse than they had the previous season in terms of points (the 1995–96 season was the first to use 3 points for a win), Mönchengladbach rose to fourth in the table. They also failed to retain the DFB-Pokal after elimination in the second round by Bayer Leverkusen, but did compensate with a run to the Cup Winners' Cup quarter-finals. This season was the last season until 2011–12 that Mönchengladbach would finish in the top half of the Bundesliga, let alone qualify for Europe.

Players

First team squad
Squad at end of season

Match results

Legend

Bundesliga

League table

References

Notes

Borussia Mönchengladbach seasons
Borussia Mönchengladbach